Letter(s) from Home may refer to:

Letters from Home (film), a 1996 short film by Mike Hoolboom
Letter from Home (film), a 2000 film starring Tom Vitorino and Kim Savant
"Letters from Home" (Voltron), a 1984 episode of Voltron
Letters from Home, a book by Karen Joy Fowler
Letters from Home, a novel by Kristina McMorris

Music
Letter from Home (Copland), wartime orchestral composition by Aaron Copland
Letter from Home (album), a 1989 album by Pat Metheny Group
Letters from Home (album), a 2004 album by John Michael Montgomery
Letter from Home, a 2011 album by Junior Mance
"Letters from Home" (song), a song by John Michael Montgomery
"Letters from Home", a song by Kenny G from Heart and Soul
"Letters from Home", a song by Johnny Cash from Johnny Cash Is Coming to Town
"Letters from Home", a song by Bradley Joseph from Solo Journey

See also 
Letters Home (disambiguation)
A Letter from Home (disambiguation)